Wandsworth Town railway station is in the London Borough of Wandsworth, in south London, in Travelcard Zone 2.

The station and all trains serving it are operated by South Western Railway.

History
The station opened as Wandsworth when the Nine Elms to Richmond line came into service on 27 July 1846. It was shifted east to its present location in "around 1860". It was renamed Wandsworth Town on 7 October 1903.

Services

The typical off-peak service from the station is:

8 tph (trains per hour) to London Waterloo
2 tph to Weybridge
2 tph via Richmond, Kingston and Wimbledon
4 tph via the Hounslow Loop Line (2 tph in each direction) (these come back to the station after the loop and continue to London Waterloo)

Connections
London Buses routes 28, 44 and night routes N28 and N44 serve the station.

Improvement work
In August 2010 a major upgrade was approved to build a new ticket office with ticket barriers on York Road. Work started in January 2011.

See also 
Wandsworth Common railway station

References

External links

Railway stations in the London Borough of Wandsworth
Former London and South Western Railway stations
Railway stations in Great Britain opened in 1846
Railway stations served by South Western Railway